The 2013–14 Topklasse season is the fourth edition of the Dutch third tier since its inauguration in the current form in 2010. A total 32 teams are participating in the league: 25 from the 2012–13 Topklasse, and the remaining seven from the 2012–13 Hoofdklasse. As usual, the competition is divided into two leagues: "Saturday" and "Sunday", who differ by the day their games are usually played.

For the third consecutive season, no team was relegated from the Eerste Divisie, this time due to the fact all 2012–13 Topklasse have declined promotion into professionalism. However, Achilles '29 did promote from last season's Topklasse to the 2013–14 Eerste Divisie, being the first amateur club to do so.

Teams

Saturday league

Source: Voetbal op Zaterdag

Sunday league

Source: Amateurvoetbal op Zondag

League tables

Saturday league

Saturday championship playoff
In determining which team becomes champion, only the achieved number of points is considered. The goal difference is completely ignored.
Therefore, GVVV and Spakenburg were considered to have ended equal and had to play an additional match against each other on neutral ground to decide which team would become champion.

Sunday league

Championship final

Spakenburg won overall Topklasse title 6-4 on aggregate.

Promotion/relegation play-offs

Topklasse / Hoofdklasse playoff first round
In the first round the 3 period winners of each Hoofdklasse league decide which of them 3 continues in the semi final. For details see Promotion/relegation play-off Topklasse - Hoofdklasse.

In the second/semifinal round, the 3 winners from the 3 Saturday Hoofdklasse leagues are joined with the team ranked 13th in the Saturday Topklasse league to play for 1 spot in the 2014–15 Topklasse Saturday league. Likewise, the 3 winners from the 3 Sunday Hoofdklasse leagues are joined with the team ranked 13th in the Sunday Topklasse league to play for 1 spot in the 2014–15 Topklasse Sunday league.

Topklasse / Hoofdklasse playoff semifinals

Source:Notes:

Topklasse / Hoofdklasse playoff finals

Source:

Ajax (amateurs) and EDO promoted to the 2014–15 Topklasse.

References 

2013-14
Neth
3